Pee Pee Island is a small island located in the province of Newfoundland and Labrador in the far east of Canada. It is the smallest of the four islands in the Witless Bay Ecological Reserve.

In 1983, Pee Pee Island was incorporated into the reserve as it provides a breeding ground for up to 1300 pairs of Atlantic Puffin and is part of the largest Atlantic Puffin colony in North America. Shortly after the incorporation, the name of the island was changed from "Pebble Island" to its current name. The island is made up of layers of dark grey sandstone and shale. It is only 250 metres from the mainland and easily viewed from the village of Saint Micheals and the East Coast Trail. The coldest month is February at -6 °C, and the hottest August at 14 °C. The average annual rainfall is 1,517 mm, with the wettest month being January with an average of 185 mm and the driest month July with 71 mm of precipitation.

References 

Islands of Newfoundland and Labrador